Ōtomo-Nata Jezebel or Lady Nata (奈多夫人, d. March 23, 1587) was a Japanese noble woman from the Sengoku period. Daughter of Nata Akimoto, she was a high priestess of Usa Jingū. She was the first wife of Christian daimyo Ōtomo Sōrin. She actively resisted against the Jesuit mission in Japan and the spread of Christianity in Kyushu.

Her religious and political influence was so great that, in fact, Lady Nata was the principal leader of the anti-Christian force in Bungo province during the rule of Ōtomo Sōrin.

Life 
Lady Nata married Ōtomo Sōrin around 1545, when he was around 15 years old. She was the mother of Ōtomo Yoshimune who succeeded Sōrin as head of the Ōtomo clan; their second son Ōtomo Chikaie, third son Ōtomo Chikamori the last two were adopted by Tawara Chikakata. She had a daughter who was engaged for a time to Chikakata's adopted son Tawara Chikatsura. Despite her husband's kind treatment of the Jesuits, she remained affiliated with her parents' Hachiman Shrine, and associated regularly with shrine maidens, Yamabushi and Bhikkhunī.

She has been described by resistant Buddhists as "the defender and martyr of the traditional religions that had given Bungo its coherence and peace until the Jesuits arrived."

Resistance against Christianity 
Lady Nata was one of the main reasons for slow and difficult spread of Christianity in Bungo province in the 1570-1580. The Jesuits readily identified her as "a witch, pagan, idol-worshipping enemy of the church", and thus nicknamed her "Jezebel", the idol-worshipping queen of King Ahab from the Book of Kings — a figure associated with seduction, desire for usurpation of the office of the king, and protection of the prophets of Baal who fought against God's prophet Elijah.

Advised by Jesuits, Ōtomo Sōrin divorced Lady Nata in 1578, his clan retainers were completely opposed the divorce. This event was the trigger for the Hachimangū's members to declare war on Christianity.

The Nata family controlled a large portion of the Kunisaki peninsula in northern Bungo, and Lady Nata held significant tracts of land herself. She gathered around herself numerous powerful supporters at court, who helped oppose Sōrin's destruction of Buddhist temples and Shinto shrines, abandonment of Shinto and Buddhism, and embrace of Christianity. She and her brothers, Tawara Chikakata and Nata Shizumoto, continued to resist the oppression of Christian daimyos and the massive presence of European Christian (specially Portugueses) in eastern Kyushu.

Sōrin turned against the Nata family and Usa Jingū shrine, attacking and burning the shrine repeatedly in the 1580s, and seizing its territories and armies to be placed under his direct supervision. After Lady Nata's death in 1587, the Nata family declined further; however, her religious influence is said to have lasted throughout the Edo period.

References 

People of Sengoku-period Japan
Women of medieval Japan
1587 deaths
16th-century Japanese people
16th-century Japanese women
16th-century women rulers